XHZI-FM is a radio station on 98.5 FM in Zacapu, Michoacán, Mexico, known as La Z.

History 

XEZI-AM received its concession on January 24, 1964. It broadcast with 1,000 watts on 1200 kHz and was owned by Guillermo Calzada Cervantes. Apric bought the station in 1987.

In the 1990s, XEZI moved to 850 kHz.

XEZI received approval to migrate to FM in 2012.

References 

Radio stations in Michoacán